Turlough O'Connor (born 22 July 1946 in Athlone) was an Irish association footballer during the 1960s and 1970s. He is a member of the Bohemians Hall of Fame.

His two brothers Padraig O'Connor and Michael O'Connor also played for Athlone Town.

Playing career
He has spells as player at Limerick F.C., where he made a scoring debut in a League of Ireland Shield game at Sligo on 25 August 1963, Bohemians, Fulham, Bohemians again, Dundalk and Athlone Town. He made 191 league appearances (scoring 120 times) and 15 appearances in European competition for Bohs (scoring 1 goal) against Rangers in the European Cup . He was top scorer in the League of Ireland in 1973/74 and 1977/78. O'Connor scored 24 times in 29 league appearances in the latter season. He was Bohemian's top scorer in 7 different seasons, his first being in 1964/65 when he scored 8 goals in just 7 games.

As of the end of the 2012 season, O'Connor is fourth in the all time League of Ireland goalscoring chart with 178 league goals. - 120 with Bohemians, 54 with Dundalk, 4 with Athlone. He also netted 15 goals in the FAI Cup (14 with Bohs, 1 with Dundalk) and 2 goals for the Irish full international team. O'Connor was capped twice at youth level.

Managerial career
He was also a very successful manager and has managed Athlone Town, Dundalk and Bohemians. His best period as manager came during his 5-year tenure at Athlone Town where the League Championship was won twice and the League Cup was won three times, with the Tyler All-Ireland Cup also making its way to St. Mels Park. O'Connor then took over Dundalk in time for the 1985/86 season. He picked up more silverware during his time at Dundalk winning 2 League Championships, an FAI Cup and 2 League Cups until he left Oriel Park in October 1993. He was not out of football long as he returned to Bohemians on 14 December 1993 where he stayed until the summer of 1998. During this time he also managed the Republic of Ireland under-17 team in the 1994 European Under-16 Championship held in Ireland in May 1994.

Career statistics

International goals

Honours as player
League of Ireland
 Bohemians - 1974/75, 1977/78
FAI Cup
 Bohemians - 1976
League of Ireland Shield
 Dundalk - 1971/72
League of Ireland Cup
 Bohemians - 1975
Dublin City Cup
 Dundalk - 1968/69
Leinster Senior Cup
 Dundalk - 1970/71

Honours as manager
League of Ireland/Premier Division: 4
 Athlone Town - 1980–81, 1982–83 
 Dundalk - 1987–88, 1990–91
FAI Cup: 1
 Dundalk - 1987–88
League of Ireland Cup: 5
 Athlone Town - 1979–80, 1981–82, 1982–83
 Dundalk - 1986–87, 1989–90
SWAI Personality of the Year
 Athlone Town - 1980–81

References

1946 births
Living people
People from Athlone
Sportspeople from County Westmeath
Association football forwards
Athlone Town A.F.C. managers
Athlone Town A.F.C. players
Bohemian F.C. managers
Bohemian F.C. players
Dundalk F.C. managers
Dundalk F.C. players
League of Ireland managers
League of Ireland players
League of Ireland XI players
Fulham F.C. players
English Football League players
Limerick F.C. players
Republic of Ireland association footballers
Republic of Ireland international footballers
Republic of Ireland expatriate association footballers
Republic of Ireland youth international footballers
Republic of Ireland football managers